is an anime adaptation of the light novel series of the same name, based on the Muv-Luv visual novel franchise.

The anime is produced by ixtl and Satelight  and directed by Takayuki Inagaki and Masaomi Ando, series composition by Takayuki Inagaki, music by Seikou Nagaoka, character design by Yumiko Hara and art and sound direction by Kei Ichikura and Jin Aketagawa respectively. The 24 episode anime series began airing on July 2, 2012 on TV Osaka, TVQ Kyushu Broadcasting, TV Hokkaido, AT-X, TV Setouchi, TV Aichi and Nico Nico Douga in Japan.

Set in an alternative timeline, Earth is invaded by an alien species known as BETA. Overwhelmed by the BETA's superior numbers, mankind develops a jet/mecha hybrid called Tactical Surface Fighters or TSF to counter them. The series follows the members of the UN Project PROMINENCE, a corp of international pilots testing and improving TSF to help Earth's war against the BETA.

Episode list

References

External links

List of episodes at the Official site 

Muv-Luv Alternative: Total Eclipse

ja:マブラヴ オルタネイティヴ トータル・イクリプス#各話リスト
zh:Muv-Luv Alternative Total Eclipse#各話标题